Species: The Awakening is a 2007 science fiction action thriller film and the fourth and final installment of the Species film series. The film was directed by Nick Lyon and starring Ben Cross, Helena Mattsson, Dominic Keating and Marlene Favela. It is a stand-alone sequel and the first film of the Species series that does not feature Natasha Henstridge. The film premiered on the American broadcast, the Sci-Fi Channel on September 29, 2007 and was released on DVD on October 2.

Plot
Miranda Hollander is a young college professor who lives with her "uncle", Tom Hollander who works in a museum. Miranda can read books by touch, without needing to open them. Miranda believes that her parents were killed in an accident while she was a baby. After her birthday, Miranda passes out and is sent to a local hospital. Tom is notified by the police. At the hospital, Miranda silently transforms into an alien form and seduces and kills several people. When Tom arrives the following morning, he finds bodies everywhere. Tom locates Miranda, injects her with human hormones and begins driving her to Mexico.

On the way, Miranda wakes up, asking for the cause of her illness. Tom tells Miranda that she is the result of an experiment that combined human and alien DNA, conducted with his friend Forbes McGuire while they were in college. Tom has been injecting her with human hormones since her childhood to suppress her alien DNA. Her parents were a fiction created by Tom to help build Miranda's normal life. Tom explains he and Forbes parted ways because of differences of opinion over their creation.

In Mexico, Tom and Miranda locate Forbes, who lives with his recent experiment named Azura, another human and alien DNA hybrid who serves as his assistant and lover. Forbes supports his experiment by creating half-alien facsimiles of dead pets and relatives for his paying clients. Forbes checks Miranda's condition and finds that she will die in days; her changes to alien form are her body's way of fighting back as her human form has a weaker immune system. The only way to deny death is injecting fresh human DNA into Miranda. Miranda won't allow that to happen when she realizes it will result in the human sacrifice. Miranda becomes unconscious, and Tom goes searching for a "donor" and is mugged. Azura incapacitates the mugger and the two bring her back to Forbes' lab, where they succeed in extending Miranda's life.

However, Miranda starts acting odd, joking about having sex with Azura. Tom checks her blood as she invites him to get drunk and have sex in their hotel room; he tells her to rest, believing she is delirious from the procedure. She leaves in a huff. Tom finds Forbes did a sloppy job; Miranda's hormones are unstable, causing her alien side to become increasingly dominant. Driven by her alien sex drive, Miranda seduces the innkeeper, another hybrid; however she kills him mid-process upon finding he is sterile. She goes to a bar for potential mates, stealing a provocative red dress from a bar singer.

Tom wishes to sedate Miranda, so they can fix the imbalance in her DNA; Forbes gives him a near-lethal dose to use, but warns that she's "100% pure creature". Investigating a church, Tom is attacked by Azura; she is angry that his arrival changed things. He knocks her out by dropping a large cross on her, leaving Azura to heal and regain consciousness. Forbes tracks Miranda to an abandoned warehouse, where she strips naked; Miranda reveals Forbes has wanted to have sex with her since they met. She squeezes his hand to make him drop the sedative; Forbes gives in to his lust, allowing Miranda to strip him. They copulate, much to his pleasure. Once finished, Miranda changes into alien form and sends her tongue down Forbes' throat, suffocating him. Tom finds them later, barely pitying Forbes.

Tom takes Miranda back to Forbes' house, where he discovers via X-ray that a hybrid child is rapidly growing in her womb. Miranda weakly says her humanity is dying, and that she doesn't want to be pure alien. Azura returns in alien form; Tom is forced to fight her. Just when Azura has Tom cornered, Miranda attacks her and apparently kills Azura. However, Azura rises again and fatally impales Miranda before Tom kills Azura with a shotgun. In human form, Miranda thanks Tom for giving her life before dying.

A saddened Tom turns on all the gas burners and tanks in Forbes' house and leaves, and as he walks away the house explodes.

Cast
 Helena Mattsson as Miranda Hollander
 Ben Cross as Tom Hollander
 Dominic Keating as Forbes Maguire
 Marlene Favela as Azura
 Meagen Fay as Celeste
 Roger Cudney as Leland Fisk
 Mauricio Martinez as Dalton
 Felipe de Lara as Burke
 Julian Sedgwick as Logan Wilson
 Marco Bacuzzi as Rinaldo
 Adam Wylie as Jared

Production

In 2006, Metro-Goldwyn-Mayer began on production of another sequel to Species. An MGM/360 Production, filming commenced in October, with Frank Mancuso Jr. returning as producer.

The producers wanted to go back to H. R. Giger's designs of the alien creature due to popularity with fans and the absence of this decision in the last installment. The original look is apparent but with different color variations and new spikes on the aliens' wrists of the nemesis. It is also the first in the series that a half-human, half-alien character does not change fully into the alien creature but has prosthetic eyebrows, veins and contacts for a long period of time in more than one scene.

Title
The film's title underwent several changes, starting as Species IV, Species: Quattro and finally Species: The Awakening. During pre-production the film was referred to as Species IV on movie websites. When an online trailer was released the film was called Species: Quattro. Eventually Nick Lyon, the director of the film, gave the film's final name on his official website. Like the previous films, the original film's logo is used for the main title.

Reception
Den of Geek gave the film a positive review, saying it exceeded his expectations for a straight-to-DVD release.

References

External links
 
 

2007 television films
2007 films
American action thriller films
Films set in Mexico
Television sequel films
2000s English-language films
2007 science fiction films
2007 horror films
Species (film series)
Syfy original films
Metro-Goldwyn-Mayer films
2000s monster movies
American horror television films
American pregnancy films
2000s pregnancy films
Films directed by Nick Lyon
2000s American films